Van den Heuvel is a Dutch toponymic surname meaning "from the hill". In the Netherlands 20,583 people carried the name in 2007, making it the 31st most common surname. The name is sometimes concatenated 
as vanden Heuvel or VandenHeuvel. Notable people with the surname include:

 Aad van den Heuvel (1935–2020), Dutch journalist and television producer
 André van den Heuvel (1927–2016), Dutch film and television actor
 Antoon van den Heuvel (c. 1600 – 1677), Flemish history painter and draughtsman
 Carlien Dirkse van den Heuvel (born 1987), Dutch field hockey player
 Cor van den Heuvel (born 1931), American haiku poet
 Ed van den Heuvel (born 1940), Dutch astronomer after whom asteroid (3091) is named
 Elly Blanksma-van den Heuvel (born 1959), Dutch politician and banker
 Erica van den Heuvel (born 1966), Dutch badminton player
 Ien van den Heuvel (1927–2010), Dutch politician and peace activist
  (born 1988), Dutch ice hockey player
  (born 1950), Dutch organ builder (J. L. van den Heuvel Orgelbouw)
 John van den Heuvel (born 1962), Dutch crime reporter
 Jules Van den Heuvel (1854–1926), Belgian lawyer and government minister
 Katrina vanden Heuvel (born 1959), American editor and publisher of the magazine The Nation, daughter of William
 Kiff VandenHeuvel (born 1970), American actor
  (born 1964), Belgian politician
 Machiel van den Heuvel (1900–1946), Dutch escape-officer for Dutch POW's held in Germany during world war two
 William vanden Heuvel (1930–2021), American lawyer, businessman, writer, and diplomat, father of Katrina
 Andrew Vanden Heuvel, American professor at Calvin College, Michigan, and discoverer of minor planets

See also 
 3091 van den Heuvel, an asteroid named in honor of Ed van den Heuvel

References 

Dutch-language surnames
Surnames of Dutch origin